OTCD may refer to:

Ornithine transcarbamylase deficiency
Over-the-counter data
Over-the-counter derivative, see over-the-counter (finance)
Over-the-counter drug